Ken Schneider is a Canadian former ice sledge hockey player. He won a  bronze medal with Team Canada at the 1994 Winter Paralympics.

References

Living people
Paralympic sledge hockey players of Canada
Canadian sledge hockey players
Paralympic bronze medalists for Canada
Year of birth missing (living people)
Medalists at the 1994 Winter Paralympics
Paralympic medalists in sledge hockey
Ice sledge hockey players at the 1994 Winter Paralympics